The Further Adventures of the Wilderness Family (a.k.a. Wilderness Family Part 2) is a 1978 adventure/family movie that stars Robert Logan, George Buck Flower and Susan Damante-Shaw and is a sequel to The Adventures of the Wilderness Family. In this sequel to the first movie, Heather Rattray now plays the role of Jenny.

Barry Williams (Greg Brady from The Brady Bunch) sings some of the songs in the soundtrack of this movie.

The third and final film in this family film series, Mountain Family Robinson, was released in 1979.

Plot
In this sequel, the Robinsons continue their relaxed life in the mountains. More adventure awaits as they prepare themselves for the upcoming fierce winter. Pat fights a bout of pneumonia as the cold weather takes hold. The wildlife continues to be menacing and dangerous at times. Skip attempts to return to civilization for medication to treat Pat's pneumonia on skis and is caught in an avalanche. Meanwhile, Pat and the children are terrorized by a pack of hungry wolves led by the giant pack leader named "Scarface" because of his disfigured eye. Toby struggles to fight them off with a rifle as they methodically tear their way into the house and finally confronts Scarface in an explosive climax. The Robinsons' courage and the will to survive, along with breathtaking surroundings, help keep the family happy in their mountain home.

Main cast
Robert Logan ...  Skip Robinson
Susan Damante-Shaw ...  Pat Robinson
Heather Rattray ...  Jenny Robinson
Ham Larsen ...  Toby Robinson
George Buck Flower ...  Boomer
Bruno the Bear ... Samson

Production
The movie was set in Canada but filmed in Colorado. Parts of the film were also shot in the Uinta National Forest in Utah.

Reception
The film premiered in Tokyo on July 22, 1978 and grossed $127,343 in its first two days from five theaters.

See also 

 The Adventures of the Wilderness Family
 Mountain Family Robinson

References

External links
 
 
 
 Official Site

1978 films
American children's adventure films
American children's drama films
1970s adventure drama films
1970s English-language films
Films shot in Colorado
Films shot in Utah
1978 drama films
Avalanches in film
1970s American films